"How Far I'll Go"  and its reprise are two musical numbers from Disney's 2016 animated musical feature film Moana. It was written by Lin-Manuel Miranda, with additional music and co-produced by Mark Mancina on its reprise. The song was performed in the film by American actress and singer Auliʻi Cravalho in her role as Moana.  It was released along with the album on November 18, 2016. Canadian singer Alessia Cara also recorded the song for the Moana soundtrack. The song was nominated for Best Original Song at the 89th Academy Awards and Best Original Song at the 74th Golden Globe Awards but lost both to "City of Stars" from La La Land. It did, however, win the Grammy Award for Best Song Written for Visual Media at the 60th Annual Grammy Awards.

Composition
"How Far I'll Go" was composed as Moana's "I Want" song, following in the long tradition of "I Want" songs in 1990s Disney animated musicals. It replaced an earlier attempt called "More", for which the demo version recorded by Marcy Harriell was released as an outtake on the deluxe version of the soundtrack album.  Although Miranda has stressed that he is still "very proud of" the song as a first draft, "More" was not good enough in retrospect because it merely expressed Moana's vague desire to see more since she had already figured out everything about the island. In contrast, "How Far I'll Go" expresses a deeper, richer message: Moana's struggle with the irresistible impulse to explore beyond the reef notwithstanding her genuine love for her island, her family, and her people.  As Miranda explained to People: "To me that's much more complicated than, 'I hate it here and I want to get out,' ... To say, 'I love it here, I love my parents, but why can't I stop walking to the ocean and fantasizing about getting out of here?' And questioning that instinct? It's even more confusing. And that's a valid story too."

To make himself write a song more compelling than "More", Miranda "went method". According to Miranda, he locked himself in his childhood bedroom at his parents' residence for an entire weekend in order to force his mind back to age 16 (the same age as Moana in the film), a time when he was facing what seemed like an "impossible distance" between the reality of his pleasant middle-class childhood which had no connection to show business whatsoever, and his dreams of a career in show business. He was well aware that he was composing the next Disney "I Want" song after "Let It Go" and that whatever he wrote had to be different from it.

According to the sheet music published at Sheetmusicdirect.com by Disney Music Company, "How Far I'll Go" is a moderate tempo of 82 beats per minute. Written in common time, the song is in the key of E major with a key change to F major for the final 10 measures. Auliʻi Cravalho's vocal range spans from B3 to D5 during the song.

International versions 

When the movie had its first theater release worldwide, the song numbered 44 versions, including a special Tahitian-language adaptation created specifically for the movie. For promotional purposes, South African singer Lira and Filipino singer and actress Janella Salvador recorded their own English-language versions of the song, while Indonesian singer Maudy Ayunda and Malaysian singer Ayda Jebat recorded their own versions of the song respectively in Indonesian and Malay language.

On December 15, a 5-languages mash-up was released online, featuring singers from Southeast Asian countries: Janella Salvador from the Philippines, Maudy Ayunda from Indonesia, Myra Molloy from Thailand, Ayda Jebat from Malaysia and Trần Minh Như from Vietnam. Shortly thereafter, a 24-languages video was released on Disney's Vevo channel.

In June 2017, a Māori-language version of the movie, featuring four voice-actors from the original English cast, was announced. Three weeks later, New Zealander Jaedyn Randell was introduced as Moana's voice. The movie was released in September 2017.
In the same year, Shruti Rane (Hindi) reprised her role in the Bengali-language version of the movie.

In November 2017, a Hawaiian-language dubbing was announced to be under way, with Auliʻi Cravalho reprising her role as Moana. The movie premiered on June 10, 2018.

Charts

Year-end charts

Certifications

Alessia Cara version

Canadian singer and songwriter Alessia Cara recorded "How Far I'll Go" for the Moana soundtrack, with the song being released ahead of the soundtrack on October 28, 2016. It was included in the deluxe edition of Know-It-All.

Critical reception
Rolling Stones Brittany Spanos called the song "inspirational and sweet" and went on to say "the uplifting song is a perfect fit into the Disney canon, with Cara belting lyrics about persevering to achieve her dreams in spite of her imperfections or detractors." US magazine Rap-Up said "the empowering anthem allows the Canadian songstress to deliver outstanding vocals about overcoming adversity to reach for goals" and labeled it "a song with a message" and an "emotionally-charged track." Taylor Weatherby of Billboard dubbed it a "bouncy, uplifting tune." Idolator's Mike Wass said "the inspiring anthem is the perfect antidote to the general ugliness of 2016" and called it "a soaring ballad."

Music video
The official music video for the song, directed by Aya Tanimura, was released on November 3, 2016. Derek Lawrence of Entertainment Weekly described the video: "The video finds Cara roaming an empty beach as she belts out lyrics that reflect the film's plot about a young Polynesian girl setting sail for an epic adventure." The video was filmed at El Matador Beach in Malibu, California.

Charts

Weekly charts

Year-end charts

Certifications

International versions 
In many versions of Moana, Alessia Cara's version of the song played during the end credits. However, several localized adaptations of Cara's version of the song were recorded for the end credits of the film as released in certain markets around the world.

Vajèn van den Bosch (Dutch), Laura Tesoro (Flemish) and Cerise Calixte (French) sang the song both for the end credits and the movie. Yulianna Karaulova (Russian) took also part in the movie voicing Sina, Moana's mother, in the Russian version.

Cover versions 

 In 2017, post-hardcore band Boy Hero covered the song. As of February 2022, the song has amassed over 2 million streams on Spotify.
 In 2019, the Swedish pop group Dolly Style covered the song for a Swedish version of We Love Disney.

Accolades

References

2016 songs
2016 singles
Alessia Cara songs
Disney songs
Grammy Award for Best Song Written for Visual Media
Moana (2016 film)
Pop ballads
Songs written for animated films
Songs written by Lin-Manuel Miranda
How_Far_I'll_Go_(reprise)
Songs written for films
Walt Disney Records singles
2010s ballads
American soul songs
Tropical house songs
Canadian synth-pop songs